Gustav Backström (born January 3, 1995) is a Swedish professional ice hockey defenceman. He is currently playing with Örebro HK of the Swedish Hockey League (SHL).

Playing career
Backström made his Swedish Hockey League debut playing with Örebro HK during the 2013–14 SHL season.

Backström featured in the opening two games of the 2016–17 season with Örebro HK before he was familiarly reassigned to Allsvenskan affiliate, HC Vita Hästen, on September 26, 2016.

References

External links

1995 births
HC Vita Hästen players
Living people
Örebro HK players
People from Lindesberg Municipality
Swedish ice hockey defencemen
Sportspeople from Örebro County
21st-century Swedish people